Gran Cuñado (in Spanish, "Big Brother-in-law") was a segment of the Argentine TV programs Videomatch and  Showmatch, hosted by Marcelo Tinelli. It consisted of a series of comedians characterized as Argentina's most prominent politicians. The segment was a parody of the reality show Big Brother, with the politicians staying at a "house" where they pretended to live, and a regular nomination process through which one participant was eliminated at a time.

Overview 
The imitations of politicians were made by various comedians of the program, disguised in ways that grotesquely mimicked the look of major Argentine politicians of the time. The scripts were written by cartoonist Cristian Dzwonik, known as "Nik". Their dialogues and behaviors were based on clichés made from well-known events or quotes of them. For example, the imitation of former president Néstor Kirchner frequently used the phrase "¿Qué te pasa Clarín, estás nervioso?!" ("What's wrong Clarin, you're nervous?!"), reflecting the conflict between the Argentine government and Grupo Clarín. The specific phrase was used several times by Kirchner during a ceremony in the town of Tres de Febrero, shortly after his defeat in the elections at Catamarca. Another example, one of the first commercials by Francisco de Narváez used the slogan "votame, votate" ("Vote me, vote yourself") which prompted his imitator to use other verbs in verbal forms like, or even the phrase "Alica, Alicate" that sounds similar in Spanish.

The imitations were developed in two main contexts, the "house" and nominations; both parodies of similar procedures performed in the reality show Big Brother. The house showed politicians in a simulated environment of everyday life, where all of them would live together. There were discussions taking place, parties, jokes among politicians, etc. The house was also the place where it was announced which politicians were nominated to leave and which ones were not, which was used to show various reactions.

Groups of participants were nominated for eviction and viewer could vote by phone to decide who should "leave the house" and cease to be part of the program.

One of the drawbacks of the format of the program was that some politicians (like Cristina Fernandez and Macri) were played by the same comedian, which prevented both being used simultaneously. This was resolved by not nominating politicians in this situation at the same time (the composition of the groups nominated was not controllable by the public), and using an extra actor in the house without speech lines assigned.

The group of politicians elected in the beginning did not include Gabriela Michetti or Pino Solanas, who achieved notoriety soon after. The program office decided to include the imitations of Anita Martínez and Toti Ciliberto respectively, but only for scenes in the house without incorporating them into the system of nominations. It was also included an imitation of Venezuelan President Hugo Chávez, the only non-Argentine politician parodied in the program.

Seasons 
There were six editions of the show in total.

Gran Cuñado 1 (2001) 
The first edition of Gran Cuñado started in 2001.

The politicians parodied were:

Gran Cuñado 2 (2001) 
In 2001, the second edition of the segment was held.

The politicians parodied were:

Gran Cuñado 2002 
The third edition started in 2002.

The politicians parodied were:

Gran Cuñado 2005

Gran Cuñado 2009 
The fifth edition of Gran Cuñado had 19 participants, and began broadcasting on 11 May 2009 with a 31.9 rating and a peak of 46 points. The triumph belonged to the imitation of Francisco de Narváez, by Roberto Peña.

This edition was broadcast for much of the electoral campaign for the legislative elections in Argentina in 2009, and given its huge success, several media suggested that it influenced to some degree its development. Several of the parodied figures made statements on the program, and some even visited it in person.

The politicians parodied were:

Gran Cuñado 2016 
The latest edition of Gran Cuñado, which started airing on May 31, 2016. However, it was canceled.

The politicians parodied were:

Political opinions
"Gran Cuñado" generated a stir in the real political world, and several leaders expressed positive or negative opinions about the program. Minister Anibal Fernandez criticized the parody of President Cristina Fernandez, arguing that "In some ways I think there were excesses, should be regulated because it is the President, and other things, was very successful: we must be fair to those things". Shortly after he recanted on the use of the word "regulate", but insisted that the presidential parody should be removed from the program. The Vice President, Julio Cobos, was also uncomfortable with his respective parody, considering that it portrays him as indecisive or hesitant. Néstor Kirchner had no opinion on the program, arguing that he never saw it. For his part, opposition leaders De Narvaez, Elisa Carrio and Macri took the program with humor.

Other criticisms leveled against the program did not target the program itself but its impact on society, criticizing that in an election campaign imitations in Gran Cuñado were an issue of debate more discussed than the political projects of candidates.

Invited politicians

In the early days of the start of the show, Francisco de Narváez met his imitator on the show "Intrusos". The success of the encounter led to a new segment being added to the Gran Cuñado: Derecho a réplica ("Right of Reply"), in which politicians wishing to do so could be invited to attend and interact with their imitators or imitations of the other politicians.

The first politician to appear on the agenda was, again, de Narvaez, on June 4. He was followed four days later by the rural leader Alfredo de Angeli, along with his brother. On 11 and 15 June were presented Kirchner politicians Sergio Massa and Daniel Scioli. On 16, 18 and 22 was the turn of  politicians Felipe Solá, Gabriela Michetti and Mauricio Macri, who played a Queen song. The last one was Carlos Alberto Reutemann on 23 June. Until the electoral ban began at midnight June 25, it was speculated that Néstor Kirchner would perform in the program, but there was only a phone call.

There were no appearances of politicians after the election, but telephone contact. De Narváez, Macri and Solá were contacted on 29 June after his victory, and the last day of the show.

References

Argentine political satire
Political satirical television series
Reality television series parodies
2009 Argentine television series debuts
2009 Argentine television series endings

es:Gran Cuñado